Back Home is the fourteenth studio album by Chuck Berry, released in 1970 by Chess Records. The album title refers to his return to Chess after several years with Mercury Records.

Track listing 
All songs written by Chuck Berry.

Personnel 
 Chuck Berry –  guitar, vocals
 Bob Baldori –  harmonica, piano (overdubs)
 Lafayette Leake –  piano
 Phil Upchurch –  bass guitar
Technical
 Malcolm Chisholm –  engineer
 Peter Amft –  photography

Cover versions 
"Tulane" was covered by the Steve Gibbons Band in 1977, reaching number 12 on the UK Singles Chart and spending eight weeks in the Top 40. It was also covered by Joan Jett and the Blackhearts on their 1988 album Up Your Alley and by Chris Smither on his 1991 album Another Way to Find You.

"I'm a Rocker" was covered by the British rock group Slade for their 1979 album Return to Base and it was the 'inspiration' for AC/DC's "Rocker" on 1975's T.N.T.

"Christmas" was covered by Clarence Spady; it was released on 11/5/21 as a digital single.

References

External links

Chuck Berry albums
1970 albums
Chess Records albums
Albums produced by Chuck Berry